Yangmei District is a district in southwestern Taoyuan City, Taiwan. The centre of the district is Yangmei town itself. The traditional residents are Hakka people.

History
Yangmei town was originally established as Yangmeili during Qing dynasty rule. The name was shortened  in 1920, during Japanese rule. Under the Republic of China, the former township was upgraded to a county-administered city after passing 150,000 in population. On 25 December 2014, it was upgraded again to a district.

Geography
Yangmei is the third largest district in Taoyuan City. The center is only 40 minutes from the west coast of Taiwan and the Taiwan Strait. To the north it borders Pingzhen District; to the south it borders Hsinchu County. To the east, Yangmei borders Longtan District. The district owes its name from the abundance of Myrica rubra (yangmei trees) when Chinese immigrants entered the area.

 Area: 
 Population: 178,178 (February 2023)

To the east, Yangmei is circled by foothills which are partly forested. a fair amount of tea plantations can be found in this area. There are also several gated communities in the hilly areas of Yangmei District—Sunny Forest Hill is the biggest and most famous of them. One of the most popular golf clubs in Taiwan, Sunrise Golf and Country Club, is located in the south of Yangmei.

Administrative divisions

Renmei, Puxin, Guanghua, Jinlong, Siwei, Yongping, Ruitang, Ruiping, Meixi, Ruixi, Jinxi, Sanmin, Yangming, Yucheng, Yuxin, Datong, Zhongshan, Yangmei, Yangjiang, Meixin, Hongmei, Yongning, Daping, Xiucai, Tungliu, Fengye, Fugang, Fufeng, Yuanben, Sanhu, Touhu, Shanghu, Shangtian, Gaoshan, Gaoshang, Jingshan, Gaorong, Shuangrong, Xinrong, Shuimei and Ruiyuan Village.

Economy
Yangmei has high-tech industry in the area, with Chunghwa Picture Tube having a factory in the city. One of the largest clusters of TFT-LCD plants are located in the area, Yangmei is also a transport hub with several container terminals present in the city. Maersk Taiwan maintains a distribution center in Yangmei. A fair amount of light industry is also present, with Youth Industrial Park (幼獅工業區) being home to much traditional industry. Another large industrial enterprise in Yangmei is China Motor Corporation, which builds Mitsubishi cars under license.

Institutions
 Tea Research and Extension Station

Education
High Schools
Chih Ping Senior High School (private)
Ta Hwa Senior High School (private)
Yangmei Senior High School

Junior High Schools
Fugang Junior High School
Jenmei Junior High School
Rueiyuan Junior High School
Rueiping Junior High School
Yangguang Junior High School
Yangmei Junior High School
Yangming Junior High School
Tawa Senior High School subsidiary junior school (private)
Jhiping Senior High School subsidiary junior school (private)

Elementary Schools
Fugang Elementary School
Rueimei Elementary School
Rueipu Elementary School
Rueitang Elementary School
Rueiyuan Elementary School
Shehwei Elementary School
Tatung Elementary School
Yangguang Elementary School
Yangmei Elementary School
Yangming Elementary School
Yangshing Elementary School

Tourist attractions
 Arwin Charisma Museum Tourist Factory
 Kuo Yuan Ye Museum of Cake and Pastry
 Puxin Ranch
 Yangmei Story Park (楊梅故事園區)
 Yangming Night Market

Transportation

Rail

Yangmei has four railway stations (from north to south): Puxin, Yangmei, Fugang and Xinfu. The railway is a convenient route for commuters in Yangmei.

Taiwan High Speed Rail passes through the central part of the district, but there is no planned station.

Road

Bus station in the district is Yangmei Bus Station of Hsinchu Bus. Yangmei is served by National Highway No. 1. Generally, it is about 50 minutes driving time to Taipei City. Provincial Highway 1 also serve the town, so that the transportation system is convenient for travelers.

Notable natives
 Cheng Chao-tsun, track and field athlete
 Pu Tze-chun, former vice minister of the Ministry of National Defense (2017–2018)
 Shuhua, performing artist and member of (G)I-DLE

See also
 District (Taiwan)

References

Districts of Taoyuan City